Temnosceloides hamifer is a species of beetle in the family Cerambycidae. It was described by Per Olof Christopher Aurivillius in 1907. It is known from the Democratic Republic of the Congo, the Central African Republic, Cameroon, and Gabon.

References

Stenobiini
Beetles described in 1907
Taxa named by Per Olof Christopher Aurivillius